Ebey may refer to:

People
Isaac N. Ebey (1818–1857), the first permanent white resident of Whidbey Island, Washington
Margaret Louis Ebey (born 1935), known professionally as Margie Singleton, an American country music singer and songwriter

Places
Ebey Slough
Ebey's Landing National Historical Reserve
Ferry House (Ebey's Landing)
Fort Ebey State Park in Island County, Washington is a camping park in the Washington State Park System

See also
eBay